Bystrowiana is an extinct genus of bystrowianid chroniosuchian from upper Permian  deposits of Vladimir Region, Russia and Jiyuan, China. Chroniosuchians are often thought to  be reptiliomorphs, but some recent phylogenetic analyses suggest instead that they are stem-tetrapods. The genus is named in honour of Dr. Alexey Bystrow, who was a Russian paleontologist. It was first named by Vyushkov in 1957 and the type species is Bystrowiana permira. Two species—B. permira and B. sinica—are known.

Bystrowiana is known from a 30 cm skull, which suggests it was a large animal, up to 2.5 m (8.2 ft) in total body length.

References 

Chroniosuchians
Permian tetrapods
Permian animals of Asia